Ajay Mahawar is an Indian politician and is member of the Delhi Legislative Assembly. He is member of the Bharatiya Janata Party and represents Ghonda (Delhi Assembly constituency).

Electoral performance

References 
 

Delhi MLAs 2020–2025
Bharatiya Janata Party politicians from Delhi
Year of birth missing (living people)
Living people